The Victorian Institute of Sport (VIS) is the government-funded sporting institute of the Australian state of Victoria. It provides high performance sports programs for talented athletes, enabling them to achieve national and international success. The headquarters are located in Melbourne. The organisation is a member of the National Elite Sports Council.

Notes

External links
 

 
Sport in Victoria (Australia)
Australian Institute of Sport